Janis Paige (born Donna Mae Tjaden; September 16, 1922) is an American retired actress and singer. Born in Tacoma, Washington, she began singing in local amateur shows at the age of five. After high school, she moved to Los Angeles, where she became a singer at the Hollywood Canteen during World War II, as well as posing as a pin-up model. This would lead to a film contract with Warner Bros., although she would later leave the studio to pursue live theatre work, appearing in a number of Broadway shows. She would continue to alternate between film and theatre work for much of her career. Beginning in the mid-fifties, she would also make numerous television appearances, as well as starring in her own sitcom It's Always Jan. With a career spanning over 60 years, she is one of the last surviving stars from the Golden Age of Hollywood.

Early life and career 
Paige was born Donna Mae Tjaden in Tacoma, Washington, the only child of Hazel Leah ( Simmons) and George S. Tjaden on September 16, 1922, primarily of Norwegian, German, English, and Cornish descent. She began singing in public at age five in local amateur shows. She moved to Los Angeles after graduating from high school and was hired as a singer at the Hollywood Canteen during World War II. During the war, United States Army Air Forces pilots flying the P-61 Black Widow chose her as their "Black Widow Girl". In appreciation, she posed as a pin-up model, dressed in an appropriate costume.

The Hollywood Canteen was a studio-sponsored club for members of the military. A Warner Bros. agent saw her potential and signed her to a contract. She began co-starring in low-budget musicals, often paired with Dennis Morgan or Jack Carson. She co-starred in Romance on the High Seas (1948), the film in which Doris Day made her movie debut. Paige later co-starred in adventures and dramas, in which she felt out of place. Following her role in Two Gals and a Guy (1951), she decided to leave Hollywood.

Paige appeared on Broadway and was a huge hit in a 1951 comedy-mystery play, Remains to Be Seen, co-starring Jackie Cooper. She also toured successfully as a cabaret singer. In April 1947, she was crowned "Miss Damsite" and participated at the ground-breaking ceremony for the McNary Dam, on the Columbia River, alongside Cornelia Morton McNary, Senator Charles McNary's widow, and Oregon Governor Earl Snell.

Stardom came in 1954 with her role as Babe in the Broadway musical The Pajama Game. She was on the December 1954 cover of Esquire, where she was featured in a seductive pose taken by American photographer Maxwell Frederic Coplan. For the screen version, the studio wanted one major movie star to guarantee the film's success, so John Raitt's role of Sid was offered to Frank Sinatra, who would have been paired with Paige. When Sinatra turned it down, the producers offered Paige's role of Babe to Doris Day, who accepted and was paired with Raitt.

After six years away, Paige returned to Hollywood in Silk Stockings (1957), which starred Fred Astaire and Cyd Charisse, the Doris Day/David Niven comedy Please Don't Eat the Daisies (1960), and as a love-starved married neighbor in Bachelor in Paradise (1961) with Bob Hope. A rare dramatic role was as Marion, an institutionalized prostitute, in The Caretakers (1963).

Musical theatre 
Paige returned to Broadway in 1963 in the short-lived Here's Love. In 1968, when after nearly two years Angela Lansbury left the Broadway production of the musical Mame to take the show on a limited US tour, Paige was the star chosen to be the first Broadway replacement, and she admired the character, saying, "She's a free soul. She can be down, but never out. She's unbigoted. She says what she thinks with a kind of marvelous honesty, which is the only way to say anything."

Paige appeared in touring productions of musicals such as Annie Get Your Gun, Applause, Sweet Charity, Ballroom, Gypsy: A Musical Fable, and Guys and Dolls. In 1984, she was back on Broadway with Kevin McCarthy in a nonmusical play, Alone Together. The tryout tour gave Paige her first experience of the eastern summer-stock circuit, where she said audiences "laughed so hard you just had to wait", and she enjoyed the role so much, she played it again in 1988 at the Coconut Grove Playhouse, this time with Robert Reed.

Television 
During the 1955–1956 television season, Paige starred in her own CBS situation comedy, It's Always Jan, co-starring Merry Anders, as Janis Stewart, a widowed mother, and her two female roommates played by Anders and Patricia Bright.

 Paige made her live dramatic TV debut June 27, 1957, in "The Latch Key" on Lux Video Theatre. She appeared as troubadour Hallie Martin in The Fugitive episode "Ballad For a Ghost" (1964). She also had a recurring role as "Auntie V", Tom Bradford's sister, in Eight Is Enough.

Paige appeared as a waitress named Denise in both the seventh and ninth seasons of All in the Family. In her first appearance, she has a flirtation with Archie Bunker that threatens to become more serious.

Paige appeared on episodes of 87th Precinct; Trapper John, M.D.;Columbo; Night Court; Caroline in the City; and in the 1975 television movie John O'Hara's Gibbsville (also known as The Turning Point of Jim Malloy). In 1982, she appeared on St. Elsewhere as a female flasher who stalked the hallways of the hospital to "cheer up" the male patients. In the 1980s and 1990s, she was seen on the soap operas Capitol (1987, as Sam Clegg's first wife, Laureen), General Hospital (1989–1990, as Katharine Delafield's flashy Aunt Iona, a lady counterfeiter), and Santa Barbara (1990–1993, replacing the much older Dame Judith Anderson as matriarch Minx Lockridge).

Walk of Fame 
Paige was given a star in the Motion Picture section of the Hollywood Walk of Fame at 6624 Hollywood Boulevard on February 9, 1960.

Personal life 
Paige has been married three times. She married Frank Louis Martinelli Jr., a restaurateur, in 1947; they divorced in 1951. She married Arthur Stander, a television writer and creator of It's Always Jan, in 1956 and divorced him the next year. Paige married composer and music publisher Ray Gilbert in 1962. They remained married until his death on March 3, 1976. All of Paige's marriages were childless.

Paige is a Republican who supported the campaign of Dwight Eisenhower during the 1952 presidential election.

In 2001, Paige found that her voice was cracking with nearly irreparable vocal-cord damage. She went to a singing teacher a friend recommended. Paige's voice ended up worse with her not being able to talk at all. "He literally took my voice away," she said. "I lost all my top voice. I couldn't hold a pitch for a second. Finally, I couldn't make a sound. He said that this will all come back. It didn't." Another singing teacher told her to go to the voice clinic at Vanderbilt University Medical Center in Nashville. "There were bits of skin hanging off my vocal cords", she said. "They told me to go home and not talk for three months." She finally was introduced by a doctor to another voice teacher, Bruce Eckstut. He helped her regain her speaking voice and singing voice.

In 2017, Paige wrote a guest column for The Hollywood Reporter in which she stated that Alfred Bloomingdale had attempted to rape her when she was 22 years old. She was sexually assaulted after being lured into Bloomingdale's apartment under false pretenses.

Filmography

Film

Documentary/short subjects

Television

Theatre

References

Sources

External links 

 
 
 

1922 births
20th-century American actresses
21st-century American actresses
Actresses from Tacoma, Washington
American women singers
American film actresses
American musical theatre actresses
American soap opera actresses
American stage actresses
American television actresses
Cabaret singers
California Republicans
Living people
Warner Bros. contract players
American centenarians
Women centenarians
United Service Organizations entertainers